Buddleja asiatica is a somewhat tender deciduous shrub native to a vast area of the East Indies, including India, Nepal, Bangladesh, China, Taiwan, Burma, Thailand, Laos, Cambodia, Vietnam, Malaysia, New Guinea, and the Philippines, growing in open woodland at elevations < 2,800 m  either as understorey scrub, or as a small tree. First described by Loureiro in 1790, B. asiatica was introduced to the UK in 1874, and accorded the RHS Award of Garden Merit (record 675) in 1993. It is highly invasive in Hawaii, Guam, and the Northern Mariana Islands.

Given the huge range of the species, it has inevitably acquired a long list of synonyms.

Description
Buddleja asiatica can grow < 7 m tall in the wild. The leaves are usually narrowly lanceolate to ovoid, < 30 cm long, attached by petioles 15 mm long, to branches round in section. The sweetly scented flowers are usually white, occasionally pale violet, and borne in late winter at the ends of the long, lax branches in slender panicles, the size of which can vary widely according to source. Ploidy: 2n = 38 (diploid).

Cultivation
A specimen is grown under glass by Longstock Park Nursery, near Stockbridge, Hampshire, one of the four NCCPG national collection holders.
Hardiness: RHS H3, USDA zones 9–10. Owing to its wide ecological range, adaptation to disturbed areas, elevation and rainfall tolerance, it readily naturalizes in tropical regions and can become invasive.

Uses
In Nepal leaves of B. asiatica are collected as fodder for domesticated animals, and the trunk is cut for firewood. During Thangmi wedding rituals, the female relatives of the groom wear necklaces made of the white flower.

References

Li, P. T. & Leeuwenberg, A. J. M. (1996). Loganiaceae, in Wu, Z. & Raven, P. (eds) Flora of China, Vol. 15. Science Press, Beijing, and Missouri Botanical Garden Press, St. Louis, USA.  online at www.efloras.org

asiatica
Flora of tropical Asia
Flora of Taiwan
Plants described in 1790